"In My Head" is a song by the South Korean rock band CN Blue. It is their major debut single in Japan under Warner Music Japan and fourth single overall. The song was written by Kenji Tamai and Yoshifumi Kanamaru and composed by Jung Yong-hwa. It was released on October 19, 2011 in 3 different editions: CD+DVD, Regular edition and Lawson store limited edition. A Korean version of the song was released on the group's third mini-album Ear Fun.

Composition
"In My Head" was written by Kenji Tamai and Yoshifumi Kanamaru and composed by Jung Yong-hwa. "Mr. KIA (Know It All)" was written and composed by Jung Yong Hwa and Ryo. "Rain of Blessing" was written by Kenji Tamai, Kaori Fukano and Keisuke and composed by Lee Jong-hyun and Ryo.

Promotions
To promote the single, the band performed in the TV shows Music Japan and Music Fair on October 22. They promoted the song in South Korea in a special Korean version of the song in KBS's Music Bank Year-End special and MBC's Gayo Daejun. The song was chosen to be the ending theme song of Supernatural: The Animation, an animated version of the TV series Supernatural.

Music video
A 30-seconds version of the music video was released in September 22, 2011 and the full music video released on September 26, 2011 on the music channel Space Shower TV. Warner Music Japan uploaded the video on YouTube on October 31st.

Track listing

Note
The iTunes version of the single does not include the Instrumental.

Chart performance
The single debuted at number 3 in Oricon's Daily chart and climbed to number 2 two days after. It debuted at number 4 in Oricon's Weekly chart with 71,200 copies sold on the first week, only behind to Kara's "Winter Magic", Bump of Chicken's "Zero" and NMB48's "Oh My God!". The single peaked number 96 in 2011's Oricon Yearly chart. In the end of October, the single got certified Gold by RIAJ for sold 100,000 copies of the physical single.

Charts

Oricon

Other charts

Year-end charts

Sales and certifications

Release history

External links

References

2011 singles
Japanese-language songs
CNBLUE songs
Songs written by Jung Yong-hwa
Warner Music Japan singles